Hikmat Dib is a Lebanese Maronite politician of the Free Patriotic Movement. He graduated from the Faculty of Engineering at Saint Joseph University. He was elected to a parliament in the 2009 Lebanese general election.

See also 

 Michel Aoun
 Gebran Bassil
 Ibrahim Kanaan
 Alain Aoun
 Mario Aoun
 Elias Bou Saab
 Issam Abu Jamra
 Charbel Nahas

References

Living people
Year of birth missing (living people)
Free Patriotic Movement politicians